Tamás Wichmann (4 February 1948 – 12 February 2020) was a Hungarian sprint canoeist who competed from 1966 to 1983. Competing in four Summer Olympics, he won three medals. This included two silver (C-1 1000 m: 1972, C-2 1000 m: 1968) and one bronze (C-1 1000 m: 1976).

Wichmann found further success at the ICF Canoe Sprint World Championships, winning a total of 18 medals. This included nine golds (C-1 1000 m: 1979, C-1 10000 m: 1970, 1971, 1974, 1977, 1979, 1981, 1982; C-2 1000 m: 1971), four silvers (C-1 500: 1971, C-1 1000 m: 1966, 1978; C-2 1000 m: 1970), and five bronzes (C-1 1000 m: 1973, 1975; C-1 10000 m: 1973, 1983; C-2 1000 m: 1973).

He was elected Hungarian Sportsman of the year in 1979 after winning two gold medals at that year's World Championships.

References

External links

1948 births
2020 deaths
Canoeists at the 1968 Summer Olympics
Canoeists at the 1972 Summer Olympics
Canoeists at the 1976 Summer Olympics
Canoeists at the 1980 Summer Olympics
Hungarian male canoeists
Olympic canoeists of Hungary
Olympic silver medalists for Hungary
Olympic bronze medalists for Hungary
Olympic medalists in canoeing
ICF Canoe Sprint World Championships medalists in Canadian
Medalists at the 1976 Summer Olympics
Medalists at the 1972 Summer Olympics
Medalists at the 1968 Summer Olympics
Canoeists from Budapest
20th-century Hungarian people